Weliwitagoda Rakitha Dilshan Wimaladarma (20 November 1984 – 29 September 2012) was a Sri Lankan cricketer. He played 28 first-class matches for several domestic teams in Sri Lanka between 2004 and 2012.

References

External links
 

1984 births
2012 deaths
Sri Lankan cricketers
Sri Lanka Air Force Sports Club cricketers
Bloomfield Cricket and Athletic Club cricketers
Burgher Recreation Club cricketers
Saracens Sports Club cricketers
Wayamba cricketers
Sri Lanka Ports Authority Cricket Club cricketers
Cricketers from Colombo